Juan Antonio Albacete Anquela (born 11 September 1957) is a Spanish football manager and former player who played as a winger.

Playing career
Born in Linares, Jaén, Anquela spent the better part of his 17-year senior career in the lower leagues, beginning and finishing with local Real Jaén. His professional output consisted of four seasons with Elche CF, which he helped promote to La Liga in 1984 by scoring ten goals in 34 matches.

Linares' debut in the Spanish top division took place on 1 September 1984, when he came as a second-half substitute in a 0–1 home loss to Valencia CF. He scored the first of his three goals in the competition on 21 November in the 1–1 home draw against CD Málaga, but the Valencians were eventually relegated after finishing in 17th place.

Coaching career
Anquela started working as a coach with Jaén, acting as assistant. During the 1997–98 and 2001–02 campaigns, he was in charge of the first team for a total of 13 games, both times being relegated from Segunda División.

For the better part of the next eight years, Anquela worked in the Segunda División B with Jaén, SD Huesca, UD Melilla, Águilas CF and AD Alcorcón. With the latter, he ousted Real Madrid from the 2009–10 edition of the Copa del Rey, with the first leg ending with a 4–0 shock win; he also led the team to promotion to the second tier in the same season, which happened to the club for the first time ever.

After two further years with Alcorcón in that league, leading the side to the 2012 promotion playoffs but falling short against Real Valladolid, Anquela moved to the top flight with Granada CF, thus returning to his native Andalusia. He was dismissed on 30 January 2013, after only seven months in charge.

On 11 June 2013, Anquela was appointed at CD Numancia, agreeing to a one-year contract with the division two club. On 30 November 2015 he returned to Huesca, replacing the fired Luis Tevenet.

Anquela left the club on 20 June 2017 after missing out promotion in the play-offs, and was named manager of Real Oviedo three days later. On 22 April 2019, he was relieved of his duties.

On 2 July 2019, Anquela was announced as the new coach of Deportivo de La Coruña, being dismissed on 7 October after just one win in ten league matches. He returned to Alcorcón after eight years on 9 November 2020, taking over from the sacked Mere.

Anquela narrowly avoided relegation in 2020–21, and was eventually dismissed on 18 September 2021 as they stood bottom of the table. On 24 October of the following year, he signed with fellow second-tier UD Ibiza, but was sacked within a month at the club.

Managerial statistics

References

External links

1957 births
Living people
People from Linares, Jaén
Sportspeople from the Province of Jaén (Spain)
Spanish footballers
Footballers from Andalusia
Association football wingers
La Liga players
Segunda División players
Segunda División B players
Tercera División players
Real Jaén footballers
Elche CF players
Albacete Balompié players
Linares CF players
Córdoba CF players
Spanish football managers
La Liga managers
Segunda División managers
Segunda División B managers
Real Jaén managers
SD Huesca managers
UD Melilla managers
AD Alcorcón managers
Granada CF managers
CD Numancia managers
Real Oviedo managers
Deportivo de La Coruña managers
UD Ibiza managers